Qadi Mahalleh (also Romanized as Qādī Maḩalleh) is a village in Pazevar Rural District, Rudbast District, Babolsar County, Mazandaran Province, Iran. At the 2006 census, its population was 228, in 59 families.

References 

Populated places in Babolsar County